The Women's Scratch was one of the 6 women's events at the 2004 UCI Track Cycling World Championships, held in Melbourne, Australia.

18 Cyclists from 17 countries participated in the contest. Because of the number of entries, there were no qualification rounds for this discipline. Consequently, the event was run direct to the final.

Final
The Final and only race was run at 13:10 on May 30. The competition consisted on 40 laps, making a total of 10 km.

References

Women's scratch
UCI Track Cycling World Championships – Women's scratch
UCI